McMahon House may refer to:

United States
(by state)
John McMahon House, Courtland, Alabama, NRHP-listed
McMahon House (Dubuque, Iowa), listed on the NRHP in Dubuque County, Iowa
Thomas and Bridget Shanahan McMahon House, Faribault, Minnesota, NRHP-listed